Shane Barry Crawford (born 9 September 1974) is a former Australian rules football player, television media personality and author. He played 305 senior games for the Hawthorn Football Club in the Australian Football League (AFL) and won the Brownlow Medal in 1999. Crawford is currently the head coach with the Ardmona Cats.

AFL career
Crawford spent his childhood in Finley, New South Wales, and played his junior football with the Finley Football Club. He attended boarding school at Assumption College in Kilmore, Victoria and was selected by Hawthorn with the 13th pick in the 1991 AFL Draft. He made his debut in 1993.

Crawford played 305 career AFL games. He is also a four-time All-Australian player and played in three International Rules series for Australia. He became captain of Hawthorn in 1999 and that season also won the AFL's top individual honours, the Brownlow Medal and the Leigh Matthews Trophy. He has won four Hawthorn Best & Fairest Awards (1998, 1999, 2002, 2003) and came equal fourth in the Brownlow in 2003, losing to the winners by one vote. He was also a member of Hawthorn's 2008 premiership side.

Crawford stepped down from the Hawthorn captaincy after the 2004 season, in which he broke his arm and the Hawks finished second last on the AFL ladder. He regained some form in the 2005 season, during which he played his 250th AFL game against the Brisbane Lions at the Gabba, and was again one of the league's leading possession winners.

He played his 300th game for Hawthorn against the Brisbane Lions in Round 19 in 2008 in Launceston when Hawthorn defeated the Lions by 69 points.

On 27 September 2008, Crawford won his first premiership in his 305th AFL match, aged 34. He played more AFL games before receiving his first premiership medal than any other player.

Crawford was offered another year with the Hawks, but he announced his retirement, wanting to go out on a high note. He ended his career after Hawthorn won the 2008 Grand Final and is now remembered as one of the greatest midfielders in the modern era of AFL football.

In 2012, Crawford was inducted in the Australian Football Hall of Fame.

Media career
Crawford was a regular panel member of the sports program The AFL Footy Show (from 2009 until its axing in 2019), a presenter on holiday and destination programs Getaway and Postcards (since 2008), and a presenter on the children's program Kids' WB (since 2014). In 2011, he was also a contestant on the first season of Channel 9's series The Celebrity Apprentice, on which celebrities compete for charities of their choosing. Crawford raised $49,311 for his charity, the Breast Cancer Network Australia. He finished third overall behind dance guru Jason Coleman and actor/comedian Julia Morris.

In 2020, he became a stand-in presenter in the 4th season of Australian Ninja Warrior and was the main sideline presenter in the 2021 season with a guest appearance from tennis player Nick Kyrgios.

World records
In 2009 Crawford set five Guinness world records during broadcasts of The Footy Show.
 Having 157 live Golden Orb spiders on his body inside a large tank for 30 seconds.
 Kissing 96 people on the face in a minute.
 By putting on 180 pairs of underwear, surpassing the former world record of 150.
 Crawford and previous Stawell Gift winner Adrian Mott broke the world record for the 100m sprint while both inside a single pantomime horse costume.
 Cracked 90 eggs with his head in a minute.

Author
In 2010, Crawford released his autobiography, That's What I'm Talking About, written in conjunction with Glenn McFarlane and released in soft-cover and eBook editions. A Junior Edition was released later.

In March 2014, a series of children's books with football themes, co-authored by Crawford and Adrian Beck were released. The books revolve around the character "Nick" who is the captain of the Cobar Creek Crocs football team. The four books, released in paperback and eBook formats, are: Crawf's Kick it to Nick: The Cursed Cup, Crawf's Kick it to Nick: Outbreak on the Oval, Crawf's Kick it to Nick: Bugs from Beyond and Crawf's Kick it to Nick: Forward Line Freak.

Breast cancer fundraising
On 16 September 2010, Crawford completed a 780 km run named "That's What I'm Walking About" from Rundle Mall in Adelaide to the Channel 9 studio in Melbourne to raise awareness for breast cancer. He took a total of 11 days to complete the run and, as a welcome into Melbourne, ran the final leg into the Channel 9 Footy Show's studio where the panel and crowd awaited his arrival. Hundreds of "pink ladies" who were affected in some way by breast cancer showed their appreciation and support by making way for Crawford as he ran into the studio. Crawford appeared humbled and initially struggled to come to terms with what he had achieved and the stories that he had heard along the journey from breast cancer sufferers and family/friends of those with breast cancer. His efforts raised $500,000 for the cause.

In June and July 2013, Crawford cycled 3,600 km from Melbourne to Perth in a fundraising event named "Tour de Crawf" that took place over 22 days. He averaged nearly 170 km per day and in total he raised $1,328,249 for the Breast Cancer Network Australia.

Honours
In October 2000, Crawford was awarded the Australian Sports Medal for services to Australian football.

Personal life
Crawford and his longtime partner Olivia Anderson have four sons: Charlie (born 2006), Benjamin (born 2008), and twins Jack and Harry (born 2011). He has two brothers, Andrew and Justin.

Crawford's interests outside football are diverse, including his passion for horse racing. In 2011, he launched his children's wear range, Kiniki, onto the market.

In 2022, Crawford made his musical theatre debut in Joseph and the Amazing Technicolor Dreamcoat in Melbourne, playing the role of 'Pharaoh'.

Statistics

|- style=background:#EAEAEA
| 1992 ||  || 9
| 0 || — || — || — || — || — || — || — || — || — || — || — || — || — || — || 0
|-
| 1993 ||  || 9
| 20 || 16 || 13 || 181 || 122 || 303 || 57 || 47 || 0.8 || 0.7 || 9.1 || 6.1 || 15.2 || 2.9 || 2.4 || 7
|- style=background:#EAEAEA
| 1994 ||  || 9
| 22 || 19 || 10 || 270 || 195 || 465 || 96 || 45 || 0.9 || 0.5 || 12.3 || 8.9 || 21.1 || 4.4 || 2.0 || 7
|-
| 1995 ||  || 9
| 16 || 18 || 9 || 188 || 145 || 333 || 76 || 38 || 1.1 || 0.6 || 11.8 || 9.1 || 20.8 || 4.8 || 2.4 || 10
|- style=background:#EAEAEA
| 1996 ||  || 9
| 22 || 16 || 10 || 343 || 194 || 537 || 108 || 55 || 0.7 || 0.5 || 15.6 || 8.8 || 24.4 || 4.9 || 2.5 || 11
|-
| 1997 ||  || 9
| 13 || 5 || 4 || 136 || 99 || 235 || 50 || 26 || 0.4 || 0.3 || 10.5 || 7.6 || 18.1 || 3.8 || 2.0 || 3
|- style=background:#EAEAEA
| 1998 ||  || 9
| 21 || 13 || 9 || 350 || 156 || 506 || 81 || 52 || 0.6 || 0.4 || 16.7 || 7.4 || 24.1 || 3.9 || 2.5 || 16
|-
| 1999 ||  || 9
| 22 || 14 || 9 || 388 || 252 || 640 || 102 || 35 || 0.6 || 0.4 || 17.6 || 11.5 || 29.1 || 4.6 || 1.6 || bgcolor=98FB98| 28±
|- style=background:#EAEAEA
| 2000 ||  || 9
| 21 || 24 || 8 || 237 || 190 || 427 || 78 || 59 || 1.1 || 0.4 || 11.3 || 9.0 || 20.3 || 3.7 || 2.8 || 5
|-
| 2001 ||  || 9
| 21 || 20 || 8 || 247 || 195 || 442 || 89 || 67 || 1.0 || 0.4 || 11.8 || 9.3 || 21.0 || 4.2 || 3.2 || 14
|- style=background:#EAEAEA
| 2002 ||  || 9
| 22 || 19 || 16 || 307 || 226 || 533 || 89 || 87 || 0.9 || 0.7 || 14.0 || 10.3 || 24.2 || 4.0 || 4.0 || 17
|-
| 2003 ||  || 9
| 22 || 13 || 9 || 279 || 237 || 516 || 65 || 81 || 0.6 || 0.4 || 12.7 || 10.8 || 23.5 || 3.0 || 3.7 || 21
|- style=background:#EAEAEA
| 2004 ||  || 9
| 10 || 6 || 3 || 118 || 63 || 181 || 41 || 38 || 0.6 || 0.3 || 11.8 || 6.3 || 18.1 || 4.1 || 3.8 || 2
|-
| 2005 ||  || 9
| 21 || 11 || 5 || 295 || 207 || 502 || 133 || 83 || 0.5 || 0.2 || 14.0 || 9.9 || 23.9 || 6.9 || 4.0 || 7
|- style=background:#EAEAEA
| 2006 ||  || 9
| 15 || 15 || 7 || 196 || 163 || 359 || 104 || 24 || 1.0 || 0.5 || 13.1 || 10.9 || 23.9 || 6.9 || 1.6 || 5
|-
| 2007 ||  || 9
| 23 || 10 || 9 || 278 || 261 || 539 || 122 || 76 || 0.4 || 0.4 || 12.1 || 11.3 || 23.4 || 5.3 || 3.3 || 6
|- style=background:#EAEAEA
| bgcolor=F0E68C | 2008# ||  || 9
| 14 || 5 || 3 || 132 || 178 || 310 || 68 || 47 || 0.4 || 0.2 || 9.4 || 12.7 || 22.1 || 4.9 || 3.4 || 0
|- class="sortbottom"
! colspan=3| Career:
! 305 !! 224 !! 132 !! 3945 !! 2883 !! 6828 !! 1359 !! 860 !! 0.7 !! 0.4 !! 12.9 !! 9.5 !! 22.4 !! 4.5 !! 2.8 !! 159
|}

Honours and achievements
Team
 AFL premiership player: 2008
 Pre-season premiership player: 1999

Individual
 Brownlow Medal: 1999
 AFLPA MVP: 1999
 4× All-Australian team: 1996, 1998, 1999, 2002
 Hawthorn Captain: 1999–2004
 4× Peter Crimmins Memorial Trophy: 1998, 1999, 2002, 2003
 Alex Jesaulenko Medal: 1998
 Herald Sun Player of the Year: 1999
 Media Association Player of the Year: 1999
 AFL Rising Star nominee: 1993
 4× Australia international rules football team: 1998, 1999, 2002, 2003
 Australia international rules football team captain: 2002
 Australian Football Hall of Fame
  Hall of Fame
  life member

References

External links

1974 births
Living people
All-Australians (AFL)
Australian rules footballers from New South Wales
Brownlow Medal winners
Leigh Matthews Trophy winners
New South Wales Australian rules football State of Origin players
Hawthorn Football Club players
Hawthorn Football Club Premiership players
Peter Crimmins Medal winners
Allies State of Origin players
The Apprentice Australia candidates
Australian Football Hall of Fame inductees
Sportsmen from New South Wales
Australian game show hosts
Aldinga Football Club players
Australia international rules football team players
I'm a Celebrity...Get Me Out of Here! (Australian TV series) participants
One-time VFL/AFL Premiership players